Richard D. Todd (1951 – August 22, 2008) was an American psychiatrist who served as the Blanche F. Ittleson Professor of Psychiatry and director of the Division of Child and Adolescent Psychiatry at Washington University School of Medicine in St. Louis, Missouri. He specialized in the genetic and environmental causes of child and adolescent psychiatric disorders, such as attention-deficit hyperactivity disorder and autism. Born in Oklahoma, he was educated at Vanderbilt University, the University of Texas at Dallas, and the University of Texas at San Antonio. He died of leukemia on August 22, 2008. At the time of his death, he was a member of the editorial board of the academic journal Biological Psychiatry, which published an obituary for him.

References

American child psychiatrists
American geneticists
Psychiatric geneticists
1951 births
2008 deaths
Deaths from leukemia
Washington University School of Medicine faculty
Vanderbilt University alumni
Scientists from Oklahoma
University of Texas at Dallas alumni
University of Texas at San Antonio alumni